Kit Downes is a BBC Jazz Award winning, Mercury Music Award nominated, solo recording artist for ECM Records. 

He has toured the world playing piano, church organ and harmonium with his own bands ('ENEMY', 'Troyka', 'Elt' and 'Vyamanikal') as well as artists such as Squarepusher, Thomas Strønen and Django Bates. He has written commissions for Cheltenham Music Festival, London Contemporary Orchestra, Stavanger Konserthus, Rewire Festival, Cologne Philharmonie, BBC Radio 3 and the Wellcome Trust, as well as collaborating with film-makers, video game developers and classical composers.

Downes performs solo pipe organ and solo piano. He also plays in collaborations with saxophonist Tom Challenger, cellist Lucy Railton, composer Shiva Feshareki and with the band 'ENEMY'. He is also currently working with fiddle-player Aidan O'Rourke, composer Max de Wardener, Berlin-based jazz avant-gardist Oliver Steidle's 'Killing Popes' and with singer/photographer Paula Rae Gibson. He teaches piano and composition at the Royal Academy of Music where in 2019 he was awarded a Fellowship. He used to teach at the Purcell School of Music and is also a patron of the ‘Musical Keys’ charity.

Biography
Having originally been an organ scholar at St Peter Mancroft in Norwich, he left to study piano, organ and composition at both the Purcell School of Music and later at the Royal Academy of Music (where he is now an Associate and Fellow). Whilst at the RAM he studied with numerous eminent musicians and tutors including Milton Mermikides. He soon began performing with and composing for the UK band 'Empirical' – with whom he toured the US, Canada and Europe (playing at 'Newport Jazz Festival'), whilst also performing with Acoustic Ladyland, Micachu, Lee Konitz and Django Bates.

He received a Mercury Music Award nomination (in 2010), BBC Jazz Award, and a British Jazz Award for his own albums, and now tours with his own group ‘ENEMY’, Troyka, Julian Arguelles' Quartet, Thomas Stronen and Sylvain Darrifourcq – playing all over the world. In 2013 and 2015 he was nominated in the Rising Star category in Downbeat Magazine (US), and in 2014 won the 'Best Album Award' at the Parliamentary Jazz Awards. In 2015, Downes recorded his first album for ECM with Thomas Strønen's ‘Time is a Blind Guide’. 

In 2013, he was asked by Django Bates to join his new ensemble ’The TDEs’ to play a new commission for both BBC Radio 3 and Cheltenham Jazz Festival (alongside his Troyka band mates). In 2014 he began touring with world famous clinic drummer Benny Greb – after playing the Meinl Drum Festival and he later went onto co-produce Benny's album ‘Moving Parts’. Also in 2014 he was asked by the Southbank Centre to write a new work for the opening festival of the recently refurbished Royal Festival Hall Organ. 

In 2015, he worked with Aldeburgh Music and Tom Challenger on a project called ‘Vyamanikal’ – a series of recordings documenting extended techniques on various local church organs – the project was later performed live at the Aldeburgh Festival. He was asked by the Cologne Philharmonie to write a new work for their organ in 2016, and has performed original commissions by Shiva Feshareki for the Union Chapel Organ. He was also commissioned by the National Youth Jazz Orchestra, the Wellcome Trust, Darmstadt Organ Festival 2015 (with drummer Jonas Burgwinkel), BBC Radio 2, BBC Jazz on 3, Jazzwise Magazine, Cheltenham Jazz Festival, London Contemporary Music Festival and the London Jazz Festival. 

Also in 2015, Downes was asked to join Squarepusher’s live band ‘Shobaleader One’ – interpreting works from Squarepusher's back catalogue for a live band. 
Downes also collaborated (on a range of acoustic and electronic instruments) with composers Matt Rogers and Mica Levi, electronic musician Leafcutter John, drummer Seb Rochford, filmmaker Ashley Pegg, artist Dave McKean, animator Lesley Barnes and geneticist Adam Rutherford (for the Wellcome Trust). 

In 2016, Downes was commissioned to compose a work for organ and four cellos for ‘Tre Voci’ to be performed in Oslo in 2016, as well as a new work for ‘Stavanger Organ Day 2016’. He later adapted ‘Vyamanikal’ for Manchester Jazz Festival 2016 and co-curated a music technology instillation at Cheltenham Jazz Festival 2016. 

52 Studies for Right Hand
Downes wrote 52 piano pieces for right-hand only in 2017 (having injured his left hand). He wrote one piece for every day of his recovery.

Between November 2017 and March 2018, Downes was part of the musical ensemble that composed music and appeared on stage for the Royal National Theatre's production of 'Network' starring Bryan Cranston. 

In January 2018, Downes released his first solo record with ECM. 'Obsidian' is a collection of solo organ works and is a musical response to volcanicity, slow processes that cause extreme reactions. A mixture of written and semi-scored/semi-improvised pieces, it focuses on the nuances and unique features of both smaller chamber organs local to rural Suffolk as well as larger grander instruments from bigger cities around the UK. It is both a study of extended techniques from instruments sometimes in states of disrepair, and a connection and adaptation of the improvised tradition of the instrument, exploring themes of duration, vibration and mechanics. 

Also in 2018, Downes worked with Aidan O'Rourke on his latest project – the mammoth tune-cycle '365'. Aidan wrote a tune every day for a year in response to a short story collection by James Robertson. The result is a major new body of 365 tunes which Aidan is recording solo and in duos with Downes, guitarist Sorren Maclean and harpist Esther Swift. 365: Vol 1 was released in May 2018. 365: Volume 2 will be released in August 2019.

Awards
 Winner of BBC Jazz Award 2008: Rising Star
 Yamaha Jazz Scholarship Award 2009
 Mercury Prize 2010 – shortlisted
 Fellow of Royal Academy of Music 2019
 Downbeat Critics Award 2019 – Rising Star – Organ & Rising Star – Keyboard

Discography 
An asterisk (*) after the year indicates that it is the year of release.

As leader/co-leader

As sideman

References

External links 
 Official website
 Kit Downes: A Young Jazz Pianist To Watch, profile article in The Daily Telegraph newspaper by Sebastian Scotney, dated 24 September 2009
 Kit Downes at Basho Records
 

British jazz pianists
British organists
ECM Records artists
Edition Records artists
Basho Records artists
Year of birth missing (living people)
Living people
Alumni of the Royal Academy of Music
People educated at Norwich School
21st-century pianists